The starthroats in  Heliomaster is a hummingbird genus in the subfamily Trochilinae.

Species 
The genus contains the following species:

References

External links 

 
Taxa named by Charles Lucien Bonaparte
Taxonomy articles created by Polbot
Higher-level bird taxa restricted to the Neotropics